The 1994 Mississippi State Bulldogs football team represented Mississippi State University during the 1994 NCAA Division I-A football season. The team's head coach was Jackie Sherrill. The Bulldogs played their home games in 1994 at Scott Field in Starkville, Mississippi. The Bulldogs finished the season ranked 24th and 25th, respectively, in the AP and Coaches' Polls.

Schedule

References

Mississippi State
Mississippi State Bulldogs football seasons
Mississippi State Bulldogs football